Eragrostis hypnoides is a species of grass known by the common name teal lovegrass. It is native to the Americas from Canada to Argentina. It is found in moist areas near water in substrates of sand or mud.

Description
Eragrostis hypnoides is a mat-forming, creeping annual, rooting at stolons and sending up short erect stem tips to about 10 centimeters in height at maximum. The inflorescences atop the erect portions have small spikelets about a centimeter long which are yellow-green to slightly purple.

External links
Jepson Manual Treatment - Eragrostis hypnoides
Grass Manual Treatment
Eragrostis hypnoides - Photo gallery

hypnoides
Grasses of North America
Grasses of South America
Plants described in 1791